George Fisher (died 1820) was an American pioneer, physician, and legislator.

Fisher settled in Kaskaskia, Indiana Territory in 1798 and practiced medicine. Fisher may have been from Virginia. He served in the Illinois Territorial Militia during the War of 1812. In 1805, Fisher served in the Indiana Territorial House of Representatives of the Indiana Territorial Legislature. In 1812 and 1816, he served in the Illinois Territorial House of Representatives of the Illinois Territorial Legislature from Randolph County, Illinois and was speaker. In 1818, Fisher served in the first Illinois Constitutional Convention. The Indiana Territory Governor William H. Harrison appointed Fisher sheriff of Randolph County in 1801. He died in 1820 in Randolph County, Illinois. Fisher is buried on St. Leo's Road eight miles below Ruma, Illinois in Randolph County, Illinois.

Notes

External links

Year of birth unknown
1820 deaths
People from Kaskaskia, Illinois
Physicians from Illinois
Illinois sheriffs
Indiana Territory officials
Members of the Illinois Territorial Legislature
Members of the Indiana Territorial Legislature
19th-century American politicians
American militiamen in the War of 1812
Burials in Illinois